The Léon Gambetta class consisted of three armored cruisers built for the French Navy during the first decade of the 20th century. Armed with four  guns, the ships were much larger and more powerfully armed than their predecessors. , the first of the sister ships to be completed, was initially assigned to the Northern Squadron where she served as a flagship. Léon Gambetta joined them there in 1910 and the sisters remained there for most of their careers.

During World War I, the cruisers escorted convoys as well as the capital ships of the French fleet. The ships participated in the blockade of the Austro-Hungarian Navy in the Adriatic Sea until 1917. Léon Gambetta was sunk by an Austro-Hungarian submarine in April 1915 with heavy loss of life. In mid-1917, Jules Ferry became a transport and Victor Hugo was reduced to reserve. She was joined by her sister in mid-1918.

They were reactivated in 1921 to serve with the Atlantic Flying Division. In 1922–1925, the sisters alternated service in the Far East, but were again placed in reserve upon their return. Jules Ferry was sold for scrap in 1928 and Victor Hugo followed two years later.

Background
The French humiliation during the Fashoda Incident of 1898, where the British forced them to withdraw from the Sudan, coupled with the earlier war scare with the British over the navigable portion of the Niger River, forced the French to realize that they were grossly unprepared for war with Britain as they could neither defend their colonies nor break through any British blockade of Metropolitan France. To their credit, the factions in the government and the navy were mostly able stop squabbling amongst themselves to reconsider their naval strategy and the types of ships that they would build.

Countering this with a distant blockade strategy would require the British to keep their capital ships at home to react to any attempt by the French to break out en masse. The distant blockade strategy required smaller ships to monitor the ports and notify the battlefleet of any attempt to break out. The value placed by the new strategy on the armored cruiser was reflected in the Naval Law of 1900 with a requirement for a new generation of five ships, of which the first three became the Léon Gambetta class.

Design and description

The Gambettas were designed as enlarged and more powerful versions of the  armored cruisers. The sisters were designed to displace  at normal load. Their crew normally numbered 26 officers and 708 enlisted men, or 30 officers and 749 men when serving as a flagship.

The ships were powered by a trio of four-cylinder vertical triple-expansion steam engines, each driving one propeller shaft. Each of the sisters had a different type of boiler; Léon Gambetta used Niclausse boilers, Jules Ferry had Guyot-du Temple boilers and Victor Hugo was fitted with Belleville boilers. Electrical power was supplied by four 1200-ampere dynamos.

Armament
The main battery of the Léon Gambetta class consisted of four 40-caliber 194-millimeter Modèle 1893–1896 guns mounted in twin-gun turrets fore and aft of the superstructure. Each gun was provided with 100 rounds which it could fire at a rate of two rounds per minute.

The cruisers' secondary armament comprised sixteen 45-caliber  Modèle 1893–1896M guns. Twelve of these were in three twin-gun turrets on each broadside and the remaining four guns were in casemates in the hull. The sisters carried 200 rounds for each gun. For defense against torpedo boats, they carried twenty-four  Hotchkiss guns, although Victor Hugo used the Canon de 47 mm modèle 1902 instead.

Léon Gambetta was equipped with five  torpedo tubes. One pair was submerged and the other was above water, both firing on the broadside, and the last tube was above water in the stern. The ship carried sixteen torpedoes for them. Her sisters were not fitted with the above-water tubes and they only carried six torpedoes for their underwater tubes. The first two ships were provided with facilities to handle ten naval mines, while Victor Hugo could handle twenty mines.

Protection
Above this was a strake of  armour that reduced to thicknesses of 80 millimeters at the bow and 70 millimeters at the stern. Above this was a strake of  armor that extended from the bow to the end of the forward casemate.

Both of the armored decks consisted of three layers of mild steel plates, of which only the topmost layer was hardened.

For the first time in a French ship, the barbettes for all of the turrets were in the form of an inverted truncated cone with a total thickness of 164 millimeters for the main-gun turrets and 120 millimeters for the secondary turrets. It had a roof that had a total thickness of 40 millimeters.

Ships
The ships were named after notable statesmen of the French Republic. The Minister of the Navy from 1902 to 1905, Camille Pelletan, chose these names to order to honor left-wing statesmen and activists, as the officers of the French Navy (the so-called "La Royale") were reputed to have rather right-wing Royalist sympathies. Fitting out of the first two ships was prolonged by accidents and mechanical problems, while the transfer of the order for Victor Hugo from the Arsenal de Toulon to the Arsenal de Lorient in 1902 greatly delayed the start of her construction.

Service history
Léon Gambetta was assigned to the Northern Squadron upon commissioning and became the flagship of the 1st Cruiser Squadron while Jules Ferry became the flagship of the Mediterranean Fleet's Light Squadron upon completion and was joined by Victor Hugo. Unlike her sisters, the latter ship never served as a flagship. She visited the United States in 1907 to participate in the Jamestown Exposition; the following year Léon Gambetta participated in the Quebec Tercentenary in Canada. After a reorganization of the French Navy and unit redesignations in late 1909, the ship was transferred to the Mediterranean in early 1910 and joined her sisters in the 2nd Light Division ( (DL)) by 4 April 1911. Victor Hugo was reduced to reserve shortly afterwards and missed participating in the fleet review by Armand Fallières, President of France, and the Navy Minister, Théophile Delcassé, off Toulon on 4 September with her sisters.

After the Agadir Crisis of 1911, the French and British governments agreed in 1912 that the Royal Navy would defend the northern French coast and the French would concentrate her fleet in the Mediterranean and defend British interests there. The French designated the consolidated fleet the 1st Naval Army and grouped its two DLs into the 1st Light Squadron.

World War I
When Imperial Germany declared war on France on 3 August 1914, the 2nd DL was tasked to escort troop convoys and the battlefleet until France declared war on the Austro-Hungarian Empire on the 12th. The following day, Vice Admiral Augustin Boué de Lapeyrère, commander of the Allied forces in the Central Mediterranean, was ordered to begin offensive operations against the Austro-Hungarian fleet in the Adriatic. He split his forces into two groups to break the Austro-Hungarian blockade of the port of Antivari, Montenegro, and to engage any ships operating out of nearby Cattaro. The armored cruisers would follow the Albanian coast and the battleships the Italian coast before cutting across the Adriatic to rendezvous at Antivari on the morning of the 16th. The latter group sank the protected cruiser  that morning in the Battle of Antivari before the armored cruisers could get there.

At the end of the month, the French began intermittently escorting single cargo ships to Antivari, usually escorted by the armored cruisers and covered by the main battlefleet. During one such mission, the 2nd DL raided the island of Lastovo on 2 November and Jules Ferry was narrowly missed by U-5, an Austro-Hungarian U-boat, on the return voyage the following day. The torpedoing of the dreadnought battleship  on 21 December brought an end to the sorties into the Adriatic by the battlefleet; henceforth the supply ships were escorted by the armored cruisers or smaller ships. The French also responded by moving their patrol line further south to a line north of the Greek island of Corfu.

Italy signed the Treaty of London on 26 April 1915, agreeing to declare war on Austro-Hungary. Boué de Lapeyrère, concerned about a possible pre-emptive attack on the southern Italian ports, temporarily moved all of his armored cruisers closer to the Strait of Otranto that day. Léon Gambetta was torpedoed and sunk by U-5 with the loss of 684 men out of her crew of 821 the following day. After the sinking, Boué de Lapeyrère withdrew his armored cruisers even further south to a line running through the island of Cephalonia. After the Italian declaration of war on 23 May, the French ships withdrew further into the Mediterranean and Ionian Seas with the 2nd DL ultimately basing itself at Alexandria, Egypt, Bizerte, French Tunisia, and British Malta; the division was responsible for patrolling the area between southern Italy and the Greek island of Crete.

At the end of 1915, the French and British decided that the Serbian position in Montenegro and Albania was untenable and that the army would have to be evacuated. They decided to occupy the neutral island of Corfu to provide a place for the Serbs to recuperate and to rebuild their army. Jules Ferry ferried some of the occupation force to Corfu in January 1916. The Royal Serbian Army was deemed fit for combat in May and the sisters provided distant cover for the transfer to the Salonica front until it was completed on 15 June. Shortages of coal and trained manpower hampered most training for the rest of the year and became even worse in 1917. As tensions rose between the Allies and the neutral Greek government in early 1917, Victor Hugo played a small role in pressuring the Greeks to join the Allies in June. On 12 August, the 2nd DL was disbanded with Jules Ferry assigned to transport duties until July 1918 when she joined Victor Hugo in reserve.

The sisters were reactivated in 1921 and assigned to the Atlantic Flying Division. Victor Hugo was transferred to the Far Eastern Division in 1922 and returned to reserve after her return the following year. She was replaced by Jules Ferry which joined her sister in reserve when she returned in 1925. The sisters were stricken from the Navy List in 1927–1928; Jules Ferry was sold for scrap in 1928 and was followed by Victor Hugo two years later.

References

Bibliography

 

 

 
 

Cruiser classes
 
Ship classes of the French Navy